14 Boötis is a possible binary star system located 110 light years away from the Sun in the northern constellation of Boötes. It is visible to the naked eye as a dim, yellow-white hued star with a combined apparent visual magnitude of 5.53. This system is moving closer to the Earth with a heliocentric radial velocity of −40 km/s. It has a relatively high proper motion, traversing the celestial sphere at the rate of 0.260 arc seconds per annum.

The visible component is an F-type main-sequence star with a stellar classification of  F8 V There are enhanced barium lines in the star's spectrum, but these are likely caused by  regions of photospheric activity rather than being a barium star. It is 2.6 billion years old and is spinning with a projected rotational velocity of 5.6 km/s, giving it a rotation period of 26 days.

14 Boötis has 1.46 times the mass of the Sun and 2.1 times the Sun's radius. It is radiating 5.9 times the luminosity of the Sun from its photosphere at an effective temperature of 6,169 K. The metallicity is near solar, based on the abundance of iron in the stellar atmosphere.

References

External links
 HR 5323
 Image 14 Boötis

F-type main-sequence stars
Spectroscopic binaries
Boötes
BD+13 2764
Bootis, 14
124570
069536
5323